Alf Aage Olsen (3 September 1893 – 18 August 1976) was a Danish amateur football (soccer) player, who played 19 games and scored eight goal for the Denmark national football team from 1912 to 1926. He represented Denmark at the 1920 Summer Olympics football tournament. Born in Frederiksberg, Olsen played as a forward for Copenhagen teams B 93, KB, and Fremad Amager.

References

External links
Danish national team profile
 Haslund profile

1893 births
1976 deaths
Danish men's footballers
Denmark international footballers
Footballers at the 1920 Summer Olympics
Olympic footballers of Denmark
Boldklubben af 1893 players
Kjøbenhavns Boldklub players
Sportspeople from Frederiksberg
Association football forwards
Fremad Amager players